The Rhiw Valley Light Railway was a  gauge railway located near to the village of Berriew in Powys, Wales. It closed on 2 October 2022.

The Railway
As an 'out and back' loop, trains return to the central station facing in the opposite direction from that in which they departed. The railway was privately built and operated, and its original owner is now deceased. The railway is now owned by his widow, who initially opened the line to the public just one day per year, in mid-summer. The railway is now open once a month from May to October. The very attractive route runs through fields and along hedgerows, and being largely unfenced there is considerable interaction with livestock from rabbits to sheep. However the railway sadly announced that it would stop operating after the 2022 season.

Rolling Stock
There are two resident steam locomotives. 'Powys' is a powerful  engine, built in 1973 by Severn Lamb. 'Jack' is a large  tender engine, constructed by TMA Engineering of Birmingham and Jack Woodroffe of Welshpool in 2003. An assortment of wooden passenger carriages (both bogie carriages and four-wheel vehicles) and wagons is available on the line.

Gallery

References

External links

Official web site
Photographs of the railway.

Heritage railways in Powys
15 in gauge railways in Wales
1970 establishments in Wales
2022 disestablishments in Wales